Blue Cypress Lake, originally called Lake Wilmington, is a lake in Indian River County of the Treasure Coast in Florida. It is the largest lake in the Treasure Coast and Indian River County. It is the headwaters lake of the St. Johns River. The sources of water are several creeks from the south (Mudfish Slough, Padget Branch, Holman Canal, and Fisher Creek), two from the west (Trim Creek, Blue Cypress Creek), and Moonshine Bay from the North that flow into the lake. All the water flows out of the lake to the northwest into M Canal and Zigzag Canal. The lake's name comes from the blue appearance of the cypress trees as the morning sun's rays reflect off the water. The Blue Cypress Village (about 70 units) is south of the small boat canal from the fish camp.

Amenities on Blue Cypress Lake 

Photography and Sightseeing Cruises are available from Blue Cypress Lake Tours.

A boat ramp, dock, picnic area and restrooms are adjacent at the Lakefront Park.

Blue Cypress Lakeside Cabins offers waterfront cabins and manufactured homes to rent daily and weekly. Located at the westernmost point of the lake, this fish camp is located in Blue Cypress Village, a hamlet on the lake which has only 3 streets, 73rd Place, 73rd Lane, and 73rd Manor. It is 24 mi (39 km) from Fellsmere by road.

Geography 

It is the headwaters of the St. Johns River. To the north is Palm Bay, to the west is Yeehaw Junction, and to the east is Fellsmere.

See also 
List of lakes of the St. Johns River
Lake Washington, FL
St. Johns River
Fellsmere, Florida
Yeehaw Junction, Florida

External links
Upper St. Johns River Watershed - Florida DEP

Lakes of Indian River County, Florida
Lakes of Florida
St. Johns River